Redemption Songs is the sixth full-length studio album by Jars of Clay. It was released by Essential Records on March 22, 2005.

Overview
Redemption Songs is a collection of reinvented hymns and spiritual songs. As part of a church community that believed passionately the blessing of understanding the story of redemption through early church songs and ancient hymns, Jars of Clay found themselves a part of a growing renaissance, one that inspired them to write new songs using the rich hymn texts as the foundation. This renaissance was the beginning of Redemption Songs, a blend of familiar hymns, spirituals, and ancient texts.

Collaboration
The band enlists vocals of friends including the Blind Boys of Alabama ("Nothing But the Blood", "On Jordan's Stormy River Banks I Stand"), Sarah Kelly ("I'll Fly Away") and Martin Smith ("Let Us Love and Sing and Wonder"). It was recorded at the band's Nashville-based Sputnik Studio, and is co-produced by the band members and long-time collaborator, Mitch Dane.

Track listing

Personnel 
Jars of Clay
 Dan Haseltine
 Charlie Lowell
 Stephen Mason
 Matt Odmark

Additional musicians
 Aaron Sands – bass
 Ben Mize – drums (1, 3-9, 11, 12, 13)
 Bryan Owings – drums (2)
 John Catchings – cello (9, 12)
 Andrew Osenga – backing vocals (3)
 Laura Taylor – backing vocals (3)
 Sarah Kelly – backing vocals (4)
 The Blind Boys of Alabama – backing vocals (4, 11)
 Martin Smith – backing vocals (6)

Production

 Robert Beeson – executive producer
 Jars of Clay – producers
 Mitch Dane – producer, engineer, mixing (2, 10, 13)
 Jacquire King – engineer, mixing (1, 3-9, 11, 12)
 Andy Hunt – second engineer
 Mike Odmark – second engineer
 Sang Park – second engineer
 Laura Taylor – second engineer
 Richard Dodd – mastering at RichardDodd.com, Nashville, Tennessee
 John Wesley – translation
 Michelle Pearson – A&R production
 Stephanie McBrayer – art direction
 Tim Parker – art direction, design, cover art
 Jimmy Abegg – photography
 Star Klem – stylist
 Alexis Abegg – hair, make-up

Charts

Awards

In 2006, Redemption Songs won a Dove Award for Recorded Music Packaging of the Year at the 37th GMA Dove Awards. It was also nominated for Pop/Contemporary Album of the Year.

References

External links
2005 Review at The Phantom Tollbooth

Jars of Clay albums
2005 albums
Essential Records (Christian) albums